The Lake of Tears is the second book in the eight-volume Deltora Quest series written by Emily Rodda. It continues after the events of The Forests of Silence, as the three protagonists brave various dangers on their journey to find the seven missing gems of Deltora. The book was first published in 2001 by Scholastic.

Plot summary
In The Forests of Silence, the topaz had been retrieved by Lief, Barda, and Jasmine. They continue on their way to the Lake of Tears, to retrieve the ruby. They learn that the land surrounding the Lake of Tears is controlled by the evil sorceress Thaegan, who has 13 monster children. As the companions travel through the countryside they rescue a man named Manus from the Shadow Lord's servants, Grey Guards. Manus is from the city of Raladin. 100 years ago, Thaegan put a spell on Raladin that caused them and all of their offspring to never be able to speak. Lief, Barda, and Jasmine also learn that Thaegan put a spell on the city of D'Or and turned it into the Lake of Tears. The companions, with Manus, escape from the Grey Guards only to be captured by Jin and Jod, two of Thaegan's children. They eventually defeat Jin and Jod and journey to the city of Raladin, where Manus hopes to find his people. Upon arrival, they find the city empty. Only when the Ralad people hear the companions, they come out of hiding. Lief, Barda, and Jasmine tell the Ralads that they must journey to the Lake of Tears, despite the Ralads pleas, but they do not tell them they are going in quest of one of the gems of the Belt of Deltora. Manus agrees to be their guide.

When they get to the Lake of Tears, the monster Soldeen attacks them. Soldeen is a giant fish-like creature who is very deadly and has the ability to speak. Using the power of the topaz, Lief persuades Soldeen to give them the ruby. As Soldeen agrees, Thaegan appears and threatens to kill them all. The ruby flies out of Lief's hand and into the depths of the Lake as Thaegan uses her magic to harm them. Just as Thaegan is about to kill them all, Jasmine's bird Kree comes and kills Thaegan by drawing blood. All of Thaegan's spells are broken: the Ralads can now speak and the Lake of Tears turns back into the city of D'Or. Soldeen is a man named Nanion and gives the three companions the gem and wishes them well on their quest. The Belt now holds the topaz and ruby and now they journey towards the City of the Rats.

Characters

Lief: Lief is the main character of the series. Lief was born to parents Jared and Anna of the Forge. As a child Lief roamed the streets of Del, sharpening his wits and gaining him the skills needed for his future quests. Though he did not know it, he was constantly protected by Barda and he prided himself on his many 'lucky' escapes. On his sixteenth birthday it is revealed to him that he must begin a dangerous quest to find the lost gems of the Belt of Deltora.
Jasmine: Jasmine is a wild girl, described as having wild black hair and emerald green eyes who has grown up in the Forests of Silence, where Lief and Barda meet her shortly after leaving Del. Her parents were captured by Grey Guards when she was seven years old, and so she has been raised by the forest. She can understand the language of the trees and of many animals, and has incredibly sharp senses, but has trouble understanding some social customs. Jasmine is usually seen with her raven, Kree, and a mouse-like creature she calls Filli. Jasmine is like Lief and occasionally has a quick temper. After helping Lief and Barda in the forest and with the help of the topaz, she is greeted by her mother's spirit from beyond the grave, who tells her to go with Lief and Barda in their quest. After this encounter, she joins Lief and Barda in the search for the great gems that will complete the Belt.
Barda: Barda was enlisted as a friend by the king and queen of Deltora and was trusted to help him find the lost gems of Deltora sixteen years before the initial story took place. For the next sixteen years Barda disguised himself as a beggar so as to discover information vital to the quest. He also became the bodyguard of Lief, albeit without Lief's knowledge thereof. Upon Lief's sixteenth birthday Barda revealed himself to Lief and the quest for the gems of Deltora began. Though Barda was at first annoyed to travel encumbered by a child, he soon saw Lief as more of a help than a hindrance.

See also

Deltora series
Deltora Quest anime

References

External links
Official USA Deltora website
Official Australian Deltora Quest website
Official Emily Rodda website

2001 Australian novels
2001 children's books
2001 fantasy novels
Australian children's novels
Children's fantasy novels
Deltora